Hartford University may refer to:

 University of Hartford, Hartford, Connecticut
 One of several unaccredited institutions that have used this name; see list of unaccredited institutions of higher education

See also
 Hartford (disambiguation)
 Hartford Seminary
 Harvard University